Oxnard Beach Park is a public beach, playground, and picnic area operated by the city of Oxnard, California at the edge of the Oxnard Plain.

Description
The park is located along the California Coastal Trail and the Pacific Coast Bicycle Route. The park includes palm tree lined pathways and a bike/walking path connecting the communities of Oxnard Shores and Channel Islands Beach. There is also an easy bike/walking connection to Channel Islands Harbor. Oxnard Beach Park includes two barbecue areas with a capacity of 200 occupants, each with a public sink, table, and a large grill. Activities include beachcombing, walking, and ocean swimming. The park was designed to protect the sand dunes between the beach and grass picnic area.

History
Jean Harris persuaded city of Oxnard leaders to adopt a grand vision in the creation of this park. The State of California initially purchased a  site for the park in 1979. With the adoption of an operating agreement between City and State in December 1983, plans were developed for this park that was initially called Oxnard State Beach. The park was transferred to City of Oxnard in 1998.

Gallery

See also
List of beaches in California
List of California state parks

References

External links
Oxnard Beach Park Visitor Information

Beaches of Southern California
California State Beaches
Parks in Ventura County, California
Geography of Oxnard, California
Beaches of Ventura County, California